The 12th Space Warning Squadron is a United States Space Force ground-based radar used for missile warning, missile defense, and space situation awareness, stationed at Thule Air Base, Greenland.

Overview
The primary mission of the 12th SWS is to provide critical, real-time missile warning, defense, and space surveillance to the President of the United States, Secretary of Defense, the Joint Chiefs of Staff,  NORAD, and unified commands by operating a phased-array radar—which continuously provides warning of submarine-launched ballistic missile (SLBM) and intercontinental ballistic missile attacks against North America—and detect, track, and identify earth-orbiting objects in support of USSTRATCOM's space control mission, thus "knitting a blanket of freedom".

The 12th Space Warning Squadron is a unit of the Space Delta 4 which is under Air Force Space Command.

To accomplish its mission, the squadron operates the solid-state phased-array radar located at the Ballistic Missile Early Warning System (BMEWS), Site I. The BMEWS site is located approximately 11 miles northwest of Thule AB .  It provides early warning detection of intercontinental ballistic missile (ICBM) launches from the Russian land mass and submarine-launched ballistic missile (SLBM) launches from the North Atlantic and Arctic Oceans against North America. Additionally, BMEWS keeps track of polar orbiting satellites. The operational crews report through the Missile Warning Center to the NORAD/USNORTHCOM Center.

The Operation Support Flight (DOO) provides direct operational support to the missile warning crews. The flight's Operations Training Section (DOT) provides all crew force initial, recurring, and supplemental training. Other flight responsibilities include hardware, software and maintenance support (MA), operational test and evaluation (DOV), and crew force management (DOU).

History
The 12th SWS was formed in January 1967 as a successor organization to the Air Defense Command 931st Aircraft Control and Warning Squadron, which was inactivated at the end of 1965. The 931st AC&WS operated a series of Ground-Control Intercept (GCI) radar sites in Greenland to detect intrusion of unknown aircraft. The squadron relayed information to the 64th NORAD Region Semi Automatic Ground Environment (SAGE) system DC-31 Direction Center, and interceptor squadrons stationed at Thule Air Base.

With the development of ICBM and SLBM technologies, the mission to monitor aircraft coming over the horizon from the Soviet Union was transferred to other units, and the 931st AC&WS at Thule AB was inactivated.

Lineage
 Constituted as the 12th Missile Warning Squadron on 1 November 1966
 Activated on 1 January 1967
 Redesignated 12th Missile Warning Group on 31 March 1977
 Redesignated 12th Missile Warning Squadron on 15 June 1983
 Redesignated 12th Missile Warning Group on 1 October 1989
 Redesignated 12th Space Warning Squadron on 15 May 1992

Assignments
 71st Missile Warning Wing, 1 January 1967
 Fourteenth Aerospace Force, 30 April 1971
 21st Air Division, 1 October 1976
 Aerospace Defense Command, 1 October 1979
 40th Air Division, 1 December 1979
 1st Space Wing, 1 May 1993
 21st Operations Group, 15 May 1992
 21st Space Wing, 1 June 1995
 21st Operations Group, 1 August 1999
 Space Delta 4, 24 July 2020 – Present

Bases stationed
 Thule Air Base, Greenland, 1 January 1967 – present

Equipment operated
Ballistic Missile Early Warning System (BMEWS)

List of commanders

References

  A Handbook of Aerospace Defense Organization 1946 - 1980,  by Lloyd H. Cornett and Mildred W. Johnson, Office of History, Aerospace Defense Center, Peterson Air Force Base, Colorado
 Winkler, David F. (1997), Searching the skies: the legacy of the United States Cold War defense radar program. Prepared for United States Air Force Headquarters Air Combat Command.

External links

 Thule AFB: 821st Space Group Official Homepage

Squadrons of the United States Space Force
Aerospace Defense Command units
Greenland